Tora Lian-Juin Harris (born September 21, 1978) is an American high jumper. He is a Princeton University engineer of Taiwanese and African-American descent. Harris is an Olympian, a four-time national champion and two-time bronze medalist in international competition. He represented Team USA twice in the IAAF World Championships in Athletics, three times in the IAAF World Indoor Championships in Athletics and has served as a representative once in the IAAF Continental Cup. He spent two years as the No. 1 ranked high jumper in the United States.

In college, Harris was a five-time All-American, while earning the two individual (2002 indoor and outdoor) National Collegiate Athletic Association (NCAA) championships. He also represented Team USA at one World University Games. He is both the Ivy League indoor and outdoor high jump record holder and Princeton's only two-time NCAA individual event track and field champion. He is an eight-time individual Ivy League/Heptagonal champion, winning the indoor and outdoor high jump championships four times each.

Early life
Harris was born in College Park, Georgia. His mother, Susan (Su-Chen), is Taiwanese. His father, Tommie Lee Harris (1934–1999), was African American. His parents made him take Chinese lessons when he was young, and he now speaks the language fluently.  He attended first grade in Taiwan, where he was introduced to jumping. Harris high jumped  in high school. He placed second in the 1997 Georgia High School Association Class AAA high jump championships. Harris is a 1997 alumnus of South Atlanta High School and was a member of Princeton University's graduating class of 2002. Harris studied mechanical and aerospace engineering at Princeton.

College career
While at Princeton, Harris excelled at intercollegiate athletics. Harris was a four-time NCAA Outdoor Track & Field All-American placing 7th, 5th, 4th and 1st in 1998, 1999, 2001 and 2002, respectively. He also was an NCAA Indoor All-American in 2002 when he placed 1st at the NCAA Championships. He did not participate in intercollegiate competition in 2000 in order to prepare for the 2000 United States Olympic trials. He failed to make the team after finishing seventh at the Olympic trials.

He won the indoor heptagonal championships in 2001, tying an Ivy League indoor record that still stood as of 2011. That year he was the Indoor Heptagonal Championships Most Outstanding Performer and Outdoor Heptagonal Championships Most Outstanding Performer as well as the Mid-Atlantic Region Male Indoor Athlete of the Year as selected by the United States Track Coaches Association. He won a bronze medal at the 2001 World University Games. His 2002 outdoor Heptagonal championships performance of  continues to be an Ivy League outdoor record.

Harris concluded his collegiate career with a total of eight Ivy League/Heptagonal individual championships. He was also both the NCAA indoor and outdoor champion in 2002.  By winning both the indoor and outdoor NCAA championships, he became Princeton's only two-time NCAA individual event track and field champion.  He finished second to Yasser El Halaby as Princeton's Athlete of the 2000–09 Decade.

Professional career
He was a two-time United States National indoor champion (2005 and 2007) and a two-time United States National outdoor champion (2006 and 2009). On two other occasions (2006 Indoor vs. Adam Shunk at 2.25 m, and 2010 Outdoor vs. Jesse Williams at 2.26 m) he earned silver medals at the US national championships despite clearing as high a height as the gold medalist.

He was a member of the United States team at the 2004 Summer Olympics along with high jumpers Matt Hemingway and Jamie Nieto. He represented the United States at the IAAF World Championships in Athletics in both 2003 and 2009 and in the IAAF World Indoor Championships in Athletics in 2003, 2004 and 2006. He won a bronze medal at the 2006 IAAF World Cup.

Harris was the No. 1 ranked high jumper in the United States according to Track & Field News in both 2002 and 2006 and was among the top 10 every year from 2001 through 2009. Harris trains out of his Chula Vista, California, residence.

He has developed, produced and marketed the electric ODK cargo bike, under the Juiced Bikes name.

See also
 List of Princeton University Olympians

References

External links
 
 Tora Harris at USATF
 

1978 births
Living people
American male high jumpers
Athletes (track and field) at the 2004 Summer Olympics
Olympic track and field athletes of the United States
Princeton Tigers men's track and field athletes
Universiade bronze medalists for the United States
Universiade medalists in athletics (track and field)
Sportspeople from College Park, Georgia
African-American male track and field athletes
American sportspeople of Taiwanese descent
Medalists at the 2001 Summer Universiade
Princeton University School of Engineering and Applied Science alumni
21st-century African-American sportspeople
20th-century African-American sportspeople